Ullin station is a former Illinois Central Railroad station located at the intersection of Central Ave. and Ullin Ave. in Ullin, Illinois. Illinois Central service to Ullin began in 1854, and two stations were constructed in 1854 and 1863, both of which were later demolished. The existing station was built in 1897. The station provided freight and passenger rail service to Ullin; the freight trains exported limestone and lumber from the village. In addition, the depot served as Ullin's telegraph station, as the area's telegraph lines followed the Illinois Central tracks. Passenger service to the station ended in 1967, and the station moved to a new location in 1972. It was moved back to its original site in 1997 and became Ullin's village hall and library in 2012.

The station was added to the National Register of Historic Places on August 18, 1999, as the Illinois Central Railroad Depot.

Notes

Railway stations on the National Register of Historic Places in Illinois
Former Illinois Central Railroad stations
National Register of Historic Places in Pulaski County, Illinois
Former railway stations in Illinois
Railway stations in the United States opened in 1897
Railway stations closed in 1967
1897 establishments in Illinois
1967 disestablishments in Illinois
Ullin, Illinois
Buildings and structures in Pulaski County, Illinois